Torreya jackii is a species of conifer in the family Taxaceae. Common names include Jack's nutmeg tree, longleaf torreya, Jack torreya, and weeping torreya. It is endemic to eastern China, in Zhejiang, Fujian, and Jiangxi provinces.

It is threatened by habitat loss and logging.

References

jackii
Endangered plants
Trees of China
Endemic flora of China
Taxonomy articles created by Polbot